An indirect presidential election was held in Malta on 12 January 2009. Former Labour Party deputy leader George Abela was elected to become the next President of Malta on 4 April 2009, when the incumbent Eddie Fenech Adami steps down; this marks the first time that a member of the opposition was elected president, as the Nationalist Party controlled the legislature.

References

Malta
Presidential elections in Malta
Presidential election